Godefridus Yerwerd, O.S.B. (died Jan 1483) was a Roman Catholic prelate who served as Auxiliary Bishop of Utrecht (1476–1483) and Auxiliary Bishop of Osnabrück (1471–1476).

Biography
Godefridus Yerwerd was ordained a priest in the Order of Saint Benedict. On 13 Feb 1471 he was appointed during the papacy of Pope Paul II as Auxiliary Bishop of Osnabrück and Titular Bishop of Tricale. On 28 Mar 1476, he was appointed during the papacy of Pope Sixtus IV as Auxiliary Bishop of Utrecht. He served as Auxiliary Bishop of Utrecht until his death in Jan 1483.

See also 
Catholic Church in the Netherlands

References 

15th-century Roman Catholic bishops in the Holy Roman Empire
Bishops appointed by Pope Gregory XIII
Bishops appointed by Pope Sixtus IV
1483 deaths